Henry Garton (1600–1641) was an English politician who sat in the House of Commons  from 1640 to 1641.

Garton was the son of Sir Peter Garton of Woolavington, Sussex. He matriculated at Queen's College, Oxford on 27 October 1615, aged 15 and was awarded BA on 20 April 1618. He was called to the bar at Middle Temple in 1626.  

In April 1640, Garton was elected Member of Parliament for Arundel in the Short Parliament. He was re-elected MP for Arunfel for the Long Parliament in November 1640 and sat until his death in 1641. 
 
Garton died at the age of 41 and was buried in the middle aisle of Temple Church on  30 October 1641.

References

1600 births
1641 deaths
Alumni of The Queen's College, Oxford
Members of the Middle Temple
People from Arundel
English MPs 1640 (April)
English MPs 1640–1648